Joe Ainley (28 October 1878 – 18 November 1907) was an English first-class cricketer: a wicket-keeper and right-handed batsman.

Born in Huddersfield, Yorkshire, Ainley played 19 games for Worcestershire County Cricket Club in 1905 and 1906, and in all claimed 26 catches and four stumpings; his highest first-class score was 13.

Ainley died at the age of barely 29 in Sparkbrook, Birmingham.

External links
 

1878 births
1907 deaths
Cricketers from Huddersfield
English cricketers
Worcestershire cricketers
English cricketers of 1890 to 1918
Wicket-keepers